Joseph H. Anderson (November 1, 1893 – January 1, 1969) was a member of the Wisconsin State Assembly.

Biography
Anderson was born in Menasha, Wisconsin. He attended business school in Oshkosh, Wisconsin. He died on January 1, 1969, at age 75.

Career
Anderson was a member of the Assembly from 1955 to 1958 as a Republican. In 1958, he was defeated as an Independent. Previously, Anderson had been President of the Community School Board and Treasurer of Winneconne, Wisconsin.

See also
The Political Graveyard

References

External links

People from Menasha, Wisconsin
Republican Party members of the Wisconsin State Assembly
1893 births
1969 deaths
20th-century American politicians
People from Winneconne, Wisconsin